This list of monarchs in the Americas includes all monarchs who have reigned the various kingdoms and territories that have existed in the Americas throughout recorded history.

Current monarchies

Former monarchies

See also
List of the last monarchs in the Americas

Notes

References